Rhynchagris is an Afrotropical genus of large potter wasps, formerly treated as a subgenus within Synagris.

Species 
 Rhynchagris mediocarinata (Giordani Soika, 1944)
 Rhynchagris paradisiaca  (Giordani Soika, 1941)
 Rhynchagris vicaria  (Stadelmann, 1898)
 Rhynchagris zebra Gusenleitner, 2000

References

Potter wasps
Hymenoptera genera